Triatoma melanica is a hematophagous insect, a Chagas disease vector, included in the Triatominae group. It occurs in the north of Minas Gerais state, Brazil, and is found almost exclusively in silvatic environment. However, sporadically it may also invade houses. T. melanica was originally described as Triatoma brasiliensis melanica Neiva & Lent, 1941. Recently, it was redescribed with a new specific status, due to its distinct morphology, genetics, and biogeographic characteristics.

References
 
 
 

Reduviidae
Insect vectors of human pathogens
Insects described in 1941
Hemiptera of South America